Evernight Games is a gaming website that ceased hosting browser-based video games in 2009. It was one of the earliest providers of online browser-based games.

History

From Monarchy to Canon 
In June 2000, Audyssey Magazine, a gaming magazine for blind people, introduced Evernight Design Corporation in one of its issues. The article stated that, in 1998, the online game Monarchy had become part of the Shareplay Network of Games, and that the original creators—Dustin Collis, Daniel Crowe, and Brian Goff—were now working for Shareplay. Monarchy was voted as Multiplayer Online Game Directory's January 2000 Game of the Month and ran at Shareplay until 2001. On November 1, 2000, Evernight Games returned, having split from Shareplay, and Canon was born. Like Monarchy, Canon proved to be successful. In August 2001, it was also given the MPoGD's Game of the Month Award.

Less than six months after leaving Shareplay, Evernight had almost 7,500 registered members. However, the bursting of the Dot-com bubble forced the site to become "pay to play", in order to keep its games running. To cater to their now paying userbase, Evernight released several new versions of the game—Last Guild Standing and Last Man Standing—and two additional theme-based message boards—Jersey Shore and Exodus 7. The early days under the pay-to-play era were troubled, with the site frequently shutting down for different reasons.

In April 2002, Evernight announced they were opening a free version of Canon to the public. The game became completely free in November. In April 2003, OMGN broke news that Evernight's Canon had been removed from the internet over an apparent dispute with hosting providers and financial problems. Tempers Ball was reduced to running from a small server. It was later announced that a move to the dedicated server was complete.

During the recorded history of the Maxim game (from late 2002 to 2005), 39,000 roleplay posts were posted in almost 2,000 story threads, Much of the creativity expressed by players of Maxim was lost, when the message boards were reset in late 2002. A June 2002 snapshot from the internet archive, Wayback Machine, shows another 23 pages of lost Maxim storyline threads.

In December 2006, following the introduction of Oliver Piotrowski to the development team, a new version of the Canon game, called Canon: Massacre, was introduced. July 2007 saw the next chapter in the reshaping of Canon. The three guilded environments—Guilds, Valid, and Covenant—were all discontinued. In their place, another new game called Unity was introduced. Unity built on the changes Massacre had introduced into the code-base, and added another selection of new elements, which included a built-in scout's database, a guild-wide news store, and a second realm to play. Unity also took nine races, including the three that had been made available in Massacre, and introduced a random "guest" race to join the usual suspects within each age.

The changes continued into the year 2008, with the introduction of the Chaos games and combining the Solo, Turmoil and Massacre forums into a single one in Tempers Ball. At this point, Solo joined Massacre and Unity in the newer version of the Canon game code. While no major features were added for Solo, it inherited the random selection of playable races from Unity, as well as receiving a few tweaks to make the game a little more fair and challenging.

The final development, in May 2008, saw the end to the Turmoil game. In its place, another new installment called Last Quad Standing was released. LQS was seeing several combinations of options from Unity and Massacre. New-player protection was set for a week, and during that time, each realm received enough turns to build significantly strong realms. NPP was then removed and sign-ups closed.

From Canon to Monarchy 

Following a decision by Dustin Collis in September 2009 to finally close Evernight Games, the community returned to the name Monarchy. Tempers Ball was left online to ensure that players could find their way to the new incarnation. In 2011, in conjunction with Table Warfare Limited, a miniature range set in the Tonan world was created, including miniatures commissioned by and based on some of the well-known players from the games' history.

Stories of Tonan 
Recent changes have also seen an attempt to bring back the historical role-play roots of the site. They are attempting to pull together the strands of several different story-lines into one cohesive overarching story. Along with the game, the Stories of Tonan forums have moved back to Monarchy.

Games 

Following closure of the site in 2009, no games are now played from evernight.com.

Games that closed before 2009

Monarchy Games 

While under the name Monarchy there were several instances available, these included Guilded (which went on to become Guilds), Non-Guilded (which went on to become Solo) and Chaos (which went on to become Turmoil). These were later joined by a second guilded game where roleplay was a requirement, called Mo-Pri.

Unfinished Alphas 

Following the return to Evernight Games two games were planned but never released. These included Godsign (a kingdom fantasy game planned to be more complex than the classic game) and Exodus Seven (a space game which existed for a while as a roleplay game on messageboards called 'Comsat Station')

Multiple Kingdom Games 

Through the years, 2 variations existed where a player could create up to 8 kingdoms at the same time. These included the short-lived Castaway, and Turmoil which ran through to 2008 when it was closed due to lack of active players.

Single Kingdom Games 

A few special single kingdom variations existed at one time or another. To take part in Last Prophet Standing, a player needed to sign up during a short period when New Player Protection was enforced. Once that sign-up window was over, NPP was lifted and the winner was the last kingdom to survive. In 2003, a special Christmas game was created during the holidays where you could select between Snowmen, Elves and Reindeer instead of the usual races. Speed was another of the short-lived single kingdom games, with a turn-rate significantly higher than all other games.

Guilded Games 

Over the years ran several guilded games, some of which ran alongside each other, until eventually being merged into Unity. These included Last Guild Standing (LGS), a short-lived guilded variation of the LPS game; Maxim and Covenant, guilded games with a requirement to roleplay; Valid, the only guilded game to include a high turn-rate; Debacle, a concept game introducing functionality where players that are killed, were converted to the faith of the kingdom that killed them; and Guilds, the all time classic and player favourite.

Games that closed in 2009

Canon: Unity 

Unity was the final game in the Canon genre that allowed for players to work together in Guilds. The game allows you to create two different kingdoms and provides four turns an hour, with a maximum of 150. Unity includes several features unusual-to-guilded games. Firstly, all 'scouts' of enemy kingdoms are stored in a central database, called Ultimabase, to be referred to later by other followers of your chosen Faith. Guild Leaders are also able to access the news from any of their Guild's member realms, rather than having to wait for the player to log in and tell them.

Canon: Massacre 

Massacre takes the turn-based gaming idea and turns it on its head. Instead of giving you a set number of turns each hour, the Evernight coders have given you all of your turns up front. This has created a King-of-the-Hill-type game, where players see how long they can survive. The game introduced only one way of getting new turns, killing other players and claiming their turns as bounty.

Canon: Solo 

Solo was the oldest remaining Canon game. Players were allowed to create one realm only, and are expected to work alone in their quest to top the scrolls. Recent developments aimed at making the game harder include an added limit in the ability to declare war. Player are now unable to attack targets that are less than 10% landmass smaller.

Canon: Last Quad Standing 

LQS allowed players to create up to four kingdoms, and spend approximately 4,500 turns building a kingdom in safety. After a week, sign-ups are turned off and new player protection is removed for all realms. The game incorporates several of the features from other games—from Unity, it includes the Ultimabase, and from Massacre, the bounty claims for dead and additional ranking scores. LQS also introduced a new method of alliances—similar but smaller—than Guilds, called Quads.

Canon: Duo 

The last of the Canon games was Duo. Duo allows you to create two kingdoms and play with the highest turn rate of any of the games, 10 turns per hour. With a turn cap of 250 turns, this creates a very fast-paced environment. The ability to make alliances has been removed like in Solo, however, unlike Solo, there is no rule preventing working with other players. Duo includes the preventions in declaring war on small targets that was introduced for Solo.

References

External links 
 Evernight Games 

Browser-based game websites